The 2015 Malaysia FA Cup Final was a football match which was played on 26 May 2015, to determine the champion of the 2015 Malaysia FA Cup.

The final was played between Kelantan FA and Felda LionsXII. LionsXII won 3–1 to win their first Malaysia FA Cup title.

Road to final

Details

Winner

References

Final
FA